The 2014 Central Connecticut Blue Devils football team represented Central Connecticut State University in the 2014 NCAA Division I FCS football season. They were led by first year head coach Pete Rossomando and played their home games at Arute Field. They were a member of the Northeast Conference. They finished the season 3–9, 1–5 in NEC play to finish in a tie for sixth place.

Schedule

References

Central Connecticut
Central Connecticut Blue Devils football seasons
Central Connecticut Blue Devils football